Holy Child Girls' High School is a school located at Entally, Kolkata, India. This is a girls' school and is affiliated to the West Bengal Board of Secondary Education for Madhyamik Pariksha (10th Board exams), and to the West Bengal Council of Higher Secondary Education for Higher Secondary Examination (12th Board exams).

References 

High schools and secondary schools in West Bengal
Girls' schools in Kolkata
Educational institutions in India with year of establishment missing